St. Mary's Episcopal Church is a historic church  in East Providence, Rhode Island.

The congregation traces its history to a Bible school formed in 1867. It was admitted into union with the Episcopal Diocese of Rhode Island in 1871, and became an independent parish in 1894. In 1878, St. Mary's Orphanage, now known as St. Mary's Home was opened; it remains in operation in North Providence.

The Carpenter Gothic church, by George E. Harney, was constructed from 1870 to 1872. It was added to the National Register of Historic Places in 1980. 

The church is one of the few buildings remaining of Watchemoket Square, a neighborhood which was once the thriving heart of downtown East Providence.

See also
National Register of Historic Places listings in Providence County, Rhode Island

References

External links
St. Mary's East Providence website

Churches completed in 1872
19th-century Episcopal church buildings
Churches on the National Register of Historic Places in Rhode Island
Episcopal churches in Rhode Island
Religious organizations established in 1867
1867 establishments in Rhode Island
Buildings and structures in East Providence, Rhode Island
Churches in Providence County, Rhode Island
National Register of Historic Places in Providence County, Rhode Island